The , also known in Japanese as the  and in English as the Bizen affray or Bizen affair, was a diplomatic incident between Imperial Japan and several Western powers, caused by a skirmish on February 4, 1868 between Bizen soldiers and foreign sailors. It developed into a crisis in Franco–Japanese relations, becoming the first major international affairs challenge for the fledgling Meiji government.

The incident occurred during a period of time that Hyōgo Port was open to foreign trade, with a community of foreign merchants and soldiers living and working in the Kobe foreign settlement. In response, the foreign militaries seized nearby Japanese warships and occupied the center of the city under the pretense of protecting their settlement. The Imperial court sent a representative to negotiate and inform the Westerners that power had shifted from the Tokugawa Shogunate to the newly-formed Meiji government. The Western representatives demanded Taki Zenzaburo, who was involved, be executed; Taki committed ceremonial seppuku on March 3.

Initial incident
On January 27, 1868, with the outbreak of the Boshin war, the new Meiji government ordered that Nishinomiya in Settsu be guarded in order to check the pro-Shogunate forces of Amagasaki Domain. By the 29th, 2,000 troops had been raised in Bizen Domain to the west, and among these were 500 (alternately 800) troops under the command of the domain's karō , accompanied by cannons, who marched over land for their destination. Because the port of Hyōgo had been opened on January 1, the troops advanced on the  road rather than that built by the Tokugawa shogunate, in an effort to avoid encounters with enemy forces or foreigners.

Sometime after 1 o'clock on February 4, as the line of Bizen troops marched along in the vicinity of Sannomiya Shrine, two French sailors emerged from a nearby building and attempted to cross the line. The Japanese troops saw this as constituting , an act of extreme disrespect under the Laws for the Military Houses, and Taki Zenzaburo, in charge of the third cannon group, took a spear and attempted to stop them. However, neither side could understand the other, and when the sailors attempted to force their way through, Taki stabbed at them with his spear, inflicting light wounds.

The sailors briefly retreated indoors but reemerged with handguns. Taki, seeing this, shouted out "Guns, guns!", which his troops took as an order to shoot, beginning a firefight. The roadside skirmish soon also targeted the European and American dignitaries who were inspecting the adjacent planned site of a foreign settlement, and several full volleys were fired. Most of the bullets missed and flew over the heads of their intended targets, but did pierce the various foreign flags flying over the old Shogunate customs house on the other side of the planned site. Whether this was warning fire or simply badly aimed shots intended to kill was unclear even in the testimony of Western witnesses.

Foreign response
The British envoy Harry Smith Parkes, who happened to be present at the skirmish, was enraged, and notified the vessels of various nations present to celebrate the opening of the port of Hyōgo of a state of emergency. On the Bizen side, Heki ordered his troops to cease fire and withdraw. There was one "coolie" killed, and a few wounded on either side.

On that same day, the Great Powers that possessed consulates in Kobe militarily occupied central Kobe under the pretext of protecting the foreign settlement, and seized the Tokugawa warships anchored off the Hyōgo port. At this point in time, the Japanese imperial court had not yet informed foreign countries of the transition of power from the Shogunate to the Meiji government, and Itō Hirobumi attempted negotiations that quickly broke down.

On February 8, the imperial court hurriedly announced the transfer of power to the Meiji government and declared the opening of Japan. Higashikuze Michitomi was assigned as a representative and reopened negotiations.

The foreign countries demanded safety for their people and harsh punishment for the Japanese person responsible for the incident—in short, Taki's execution. There was some complaint that this was too harsh for an incident in which no one had actually died, and to the Japanese Taki's response to the foreign troops' tomowari seemed altogether natural, but in the face of a demand from the Great Powers there was nothing to be done. Date Munenari sent an appeal for clemency via Itō Hirobumi and Godai Tomoatsu, which arrived just in time, but was rejected by a vote of the foreign ministers, beginning with the French Consul General Léon Roches.

Finally, on February 24, Bizen Domain acceded to the foreign countries' demands. Taki committed seppuku before the assembled foreign officials at Eifuku-ji Temple in Osaka on March 3. Heki, who had been in command of the troops, was simultaneously placed under house arrest, and the incident was tentatively resolved.

Significance
The Kobe Incident represented the first international diplomatic incident faced by the new government after the restoration of Imperial rule. Though this incident was ultimately resolved when the foreign powers forced the execution of Taki Zenzaburo (jp), it did demonstrate to them that the new Meiji government was now the ruling administration to deal with in terms of Japan's foreign policy. However, as the jōi faction did retain support in the new administration, the new foreign policy was not made clear internally. An official declaration of the change was finally made the next year, on July 7, 1869, based on a decision by the  national council.

See also
 Diplomatic (contractual or in treatise) faux-pas
The Robinson Affair (Namamugi Incident)

Notes

References

Japanese sources
, held by the Diplomatic Archives of the Ministry of Foreign Affairs of Japan, available online via the Japan Center for Asian Historical Records with reference number B08090131500.

Western sources

 

1868 in Japan
Boshin War
Japan–United Kingdom relations
France–Japan relations
Japan–United States relations
Francophobia
Anti-Americanism